Vijay Chopra (born 5 July 1948) is a former Indian cricketer and umpire. He played in 65 first-class matches between 1974 and 1984. He later stood in six One Day International (ODI) matches between 1996 and 2002.

See also
 List of One Day International cricket umpires

References

External links

1948 births
Living people
Indian One Day International cricket umpires
Cricketers from Delhi
Indian cricketers
Uttar Pradesh cricketers
Central Zone cricketers
Wicket-keepers